Markhamia obtusifolia is a species of plant in the family Bignoniaceae. It is found in Southern Africa.

This species usually grows as a shrub or small to medium tree, reaching heights of 5–15 m. Found in sparsely treed areas, such as fields. Flowers are yellow, and fruit is a long capsule shape.

References

External links

Flora of Mozambique
Flora of Rwanda
obtusifolia
Taxa named by John Gilbert Baker
Taxa named by Thomas Archibald Sprague